Mohpa is a city with a municipal council in Nagpur district in the Indian state of Maharashtra. Although physically located within Kalmeshwar ( former in saoner) taluka, it is not subject to taluka governance. It is divided in to basically three part

1.Galbardi "गळबर्डी"- this area is at the beginning and higher in height from Mohpa, so in regional language hill means 'Gal' and area means 'Bardi'

2.Mohpa "मोहपा"- main town which includes regular market for daily needs 
.

Mohpa has an old Ram mandir. The mandir is having beautiful Ram panchayatan. It also has the Samadhi of a noble saint Shri. Tukaram Maharaj. Every navratri the local people witness a well planned utsav for all 9 days. Mohpa is famous for its bull market from past 50 years, although orange farm is the main identity of this town.

Geography
Mohpa is located on a tributary of the Chandrabhaga River. It has an average elevation of 351 metres (1151 feet).

History
Before 1955, Mohpa was a panchayat village, but it was given municipal status that year,

Demographics
 India census, Mohpa had a population of 7,068. Males constituted 51% of the population and females 49%. Mohpa had an average literacy rate of 74%, higher than the national average of 59.5%: male literacy was 81%, and female literacy was 66%. In Mohpa, 11% of the population was under 6 years of age.

References

Cities and towns in Nagpur district